JoWooD Entertainment AG (formerly JoWooD Productions Software AG, commonly referred to as JoWooD) was an Austrian video game publisher that was founded in 1995. JoWooD went into administration in 2011 and all assets were purchased by Nordic Games.

Its games include the futuristic racing car game Beam Breakers which was released in 2002, action role-playing games in the Gothic series, the SpellForce series, and the Industry Giant series of games. Other titles include Transport Giant, World War III: Black Gold, The Sting!, Hotel Giant, and other games of the Giants series.

History
JoWooD Productions Software AG was founded in 1995 in Ebensee by Dieter Bernauer, Johann Reitinger, Johann Schilcher, and Andreas Tobler with its headquarters later moved to Liezen, Austria. It owned five subsidiaries in the last years: DreamCatcher Interactive, JoWooD Distribution Services, JoWooD Deutschland, JoWooD Iberica and Quantic Lab. In May 2002, JoWooD acquired Ravensburger Interactive and its sister company Fishtank Interactive.

In August 2005, JoWooD attempted to end their development agreement with developer Perception Pty because of a lack of quality on their "Stargate SG-1" product. JoWooD carried out this action believing they owned the licence for the game Stargate SG-1: The Alliance, which was disputed by Perception.

On 4 November 2006, JoWooD announced the acquisition of DreamCatcher Games, in efforts to move to the North American game markets.

In January 2007, JoWooD announced a UK distribution agreement with Pinnacle Software to allow the latter to distribute JoWooD's titles.

In October 2009, JoWooD changed its name from JoWooD Productions Software AG to JoWooD Entertainment AG. At the same time, JoWood also announced an agreement with Valve to make available future JoWooD titles on Steam.

On 7 January 2011, JoWooD officially filed for bankruptcy and announced that the company would prepare for "a procedure of capital reorganization". However, on 21 April 2011, JoWooD announced that, unable to negotiate with potential investors, they were officially facing bankruptcy proceedings and had withdrawn their application for a recapitalization plan. In June 2011, JoWooD Entertainment all their assets and its subsidiary, Quantic Lab, was acquired by Nordic Games. From this point on, JoWooD was no longer operating. All activities of the two companies were taken over by Nordic Games. On 16 August 2011, Nordic Games announced that it had acquired JoWooD's products and brands and some of the companies labels, including The Adventure Company. Following the acquisition it was announced that JoWood and the Adventure Company would become publishing labels for Nordic Games, a wholly owned subsidiary of Nordic Games Holding.

Games published

References

Economy of Styria
THQ Nordic
Video game companies established in 1995
Video game companies disestablished in 2011
Defunct video game companies of Austria
Video game publishers
Austrian companies established in 1995
2011 disestablishments in Austria